Glenn William Ralph (born 12 July 1956) is an English professional golfer.

Ralph was born in Haslemere, Surrey. He turned professional in 1973, and played on the European Tour for many years. His best season came in 1987 when he finished in 51st place on the Order of Merit.

Since turning 50, Ralph has competed on the European Senior Tour, where he has enjoyed some success. Having finished 36th on the money list in 2006, and 23rd in 2007, he missed virtually the entire 2008 season having broken his ankle. He won his first title in 2009 at the Cleveland Golf/Srixon Scottish Senior Open.

Professional wins (1)

European Senior Tour wins (1)

European Senior Tour playoff record (0–1)

Results in major championships

Note: Ralph only played in The Open Championship.

CUT = missed the half-way cut (3rd round cut in 1980 Open Championship)
"T" = tied

Team appearances
Europcar Cup (representing England): 1988

External links

English male golfers
European Tour golfers
European Senior Tour golfers
People from Haslemere
1956 births
Living people